Upul Sanjeewa Galappaththi (born 7 February 1979) is a Sri Lankan physician, politician and Member of Parliament.

Galappaththi was born on 7 February 1979. He was educated at Tissamaharama National School and Debarawewa National School. He has a degree in medicine from the University of Ruhuna. He was the Hambantota District Co-ordinator for the Government Medical Officers Association and founder of the Hela Bodu Maga.

Galappaththi contested the 2020 parliamentary election as a Sri Lanka People's Freedom Alliance electoral alliance candidate in Hambantota District and was elected to the Parliament of Sri Lanka.

References

1979 births
Alumni of the University of Ruhuna
Living people
Members of the 16th Parliament of Sri Lanka
Sinhalese physicians
Sinhalese politicians
Sri Lankan Buddhists
Sri Lanka People's Freedom Alliance politicians
Sri Lanka Podujana Peramuna politicians